Thierry la Fronde (Terry the Sling) was a French television series that aired from 1963 to 1966 on the television station, ORTF. The original script was by Jean-Claude Deret.

Dubbed into English, the series was shown internationally in the 1960s, including Canada and Australia, where it was referred to under the original name, and also as The King's Outlaw. It was shown as well in Poland as Thierry Śmiałek (Thierry the Daredevil). On ABC in Australia, it was called The King's Outlaw.  In the Netherlands, 32 of the 52 episodes were shown in 1967 as Thierry de Slingeraar (Thierry the Sling), as a Netherlands Television Service programme.

Synopsis
In 1356, during the Hundred Years' War, France is occupied by the English, and the Black Prince rules France with an iron fist. In Sologne in the heart of France, Thierry of Janville, a young lord, fights gallantly against the English occupation but is betrayed by his steward, Florent, and loses his title and his lands. He then takes the name of "Thierry La Fronde", and with the help of his faithful companions continues his fight undercover.

Actors
Jean-Claude Drouot: Thierry of Janville, known as "Thierry La Fronde"
Céline Léger: Isabelle
Jean Gras: Bertrand
Robert Bazil: Boucicault
Robert Rollis: Jehan
Clément Michu: Martin
Jean-Claude Deret: Florent
Bernard Rousselet: Pierre
Fernand Bellan: Judas

Production

The programme theme music was a simple tune in the Dorian mode composed by Jacques Loussier, and performed on a brass instrument (possibly a French horn) for the melody.

A co-production of Téléfrance and RTF, 52 episodes of 26 minutes each were produced in black and white (November 1963 to March 1966), and first broadcast in 1963.

Reception

The series was created to compete with the overwhelming British and U.S. film productions with mediaeval themes and became one of the most popular programmes on French television in the 1960s. It is credited with boosting the use of the sling shot in French school playgrounds and turning the relatively rare first name, Thierry, into one of the most popular names for French boys.

In 1964 Lucien Nortier drew a comic strip adaptation, published in Le Journal de Mickey. In October 2012, it was announced that a modern version of the programme was in production.

See also
 Château-Thierry

References

External links
 
 List of music releases by Jacques Loussier at discogs.com
  - as by Jean-Claude Drouot
 List of releases by John William at discogs.com

French adventure television series
French drama television series
Television shows set in France
French children's television series
1960s French television series
1963 French television series debuts
1966 French television series endings
Television series set in the 14th century
Hundred Years' War in fiction
Fronde, Thierry la
Fronde, Thierry la
Fronde, Thierry la
Television shows adapted into novels
Television shows adapted into comics